Muskogean (also Muskhogean, Muskogee) is a Native American  language family spoken in different areas of the Southeastern United States. Though the debate concerning their interrelationships is ongoing, the Muskogean languages are generally divided into two branches, Eastern Muskogean and Western Muskogean. Typologically, Muskogean languages are agglutinative. One documented language, Apalachee, is extinct and the remaining languages are critically endangered.

Genetic relationships

Family division
The Muskogean family consists of six languages that are still spoken: Alabama, Chickasaw, Choctaw, Creek-Seminole, Koasati, and Mikasuki, as well as the now-extinct Apalachee, Houma, and Hitchiti (the last is generally considered a dialect of Mikasuki). "Seminole" is listed as one of the Muskogean languages in Hardy's list, but it is generally considered a dialect of Creek rather than a separate language, as she comments.

The major subdivisions of the family have long been controversial, but the following lower-level groups are universally accepted: Choctaw–Chickasaw, Alabama–Koasati, Hitchiti–Mikasuki, and Creek–Seminole. Because Apalachee is extinct, its precise relationship to the other languages is uncertain; Mary Haas and Pamela Munro both classify it with the Alabama–Koasati group.

Haas's classification
For connections among these groupings, the traditional classification is that of Mary Haas and her students, such as Karen Booker, in which "Western Muskogean" (Choctaw-Chickasaw) is seen as one major branch, and "Eastern Muskogean" (Alabama-Koasati, Hitchiti-Mikasuki, and Creek-Seminole) as another. Within Eastern Muskogean, Alabama-Koasati and Hitchiti-Mikasuki are generally thought to be more closely related to each other than to Creek-Seminole. That classification is reflected in the list below:

Western Muskogean
 Chickasaw
 Choctaw (also called Chahta, Chacato)
Eastern Muskogean
 Creek-Seminole (also called Muskogee, Maskoke, Seminole)
 Hitchiti-Mikasuki (also called Miccosukee)
 Apalachee–Alabama–Koasati
 Apalachee †
 Alabama (also called Alibamu)
 Koasati (also called Coushatta)

Munro's classification
A more recent and controversial classification has been proposed by Pamela Munro. In her classification, the languages are divided into a "Southern Muskogean" branch (Choctaw-Chickasaw, Alabama-Koasati, and Hitchiti-Mikasuki) and a "Northern Muskogean" one (Creek-Seminole). Southern Muskogean is the subdivided into Hitchiti-Mikasuki and a "Southwestern Muskogean" branch containing Alabama-Koasati and "Western Muskogean" (Choctaw-Chickasaw). The classification is reflected in the list below:

Northern Muskogean:
Creek-Seminole

Southern Muskogean:
Hitchiti-Mikasuki
 Southwestern Muskogean
 Apalachee (†)
 Alabama–Koasati
 Alabama
 Koasati
 Western Muskogean
 Chickasaw
 Choctaw

Kimball's classification
A third proposed classification is that of Geoffrey Kimball, who envisions a threeway split among the languages, with "Western Muskogean" (Choctaw-Chickasaw), "Eastern Muskogean" (Creek-Seminole), and "Central Muskogean" (Alabama-Koasati and Hitchiti-Mikasuki). However, Kimball's classification has not received as much support as either Haas's or Munro's.

Broader relationships

Possible Muskogean languages
Several sparsely attested languages have been claimed to be Muskogean languages. George Broadwell suggested that the languages of the Yamasee and Guale were Muskogean. However, William Sturtevant argued that the "Yamasee" and "Guale" data were Creek and that the language(s) spoken by the Yamasee and Guale people remain unknown. It is possible that the Yamasee were an amalgamation of several different ethnic groups and did not speak a single language. Chester B. DePratter describes the Yamasee as consisting mainly of speakers of Hitchiti and Guale. The historian Steven Oatis also describes the Yamasee as an ethnically mixed group that included people from Muskogean-speaking regions, such as the early colonial-era native towns of Hitchiti, Coweta, and Cussita.

The Pensacola and Chatot (or Chacato) people are reported to have spoken the same Muskogean language, which may have been closely related to Choctaw.

Sparse evidence indicates that a Muskogean language was spoken by at least some of the people of the paramount chiefdom of Cofitachequi in northeastern South Carolina. If so, that would be the most eastern outpost of Muskogean. The people of Cofitichequi were probably absorbed by nearby Siouan and Iroquoian speakers in the late 17th century.

A vocabulary of the Houma may be another underdocumented Western Muskogean language or a version of Mobilian Jargon. Mobilian Jargon is a pidgin based on Western Muskogean.

Gulf

The best-known connection proposed between Muskogean and other languages is Mary Haas' Gulf hypothesis, in which she conceived of a macrofamily comprising Muskogean and a number of language isolates of the southeastern US: Atakapa, Chitimacha, Tunica, and Natchez. While well-known, the Gulf grouping is now generally rejected by historical linguists. A number of Muskogean scholars continue to believe that Muskogean is related to Natchez.

Features

Phonology
Proto-Muskogean is reconstructed as having the consonants (given in IPA transcription):

Haas reconstructed it as a voiceless  (that is), based partly on presumed cognates in Natchez.

Nouns
Most family languages display lexical accent on nouns and grammatical case, which distinguishes the nominative from the oblique. Nouns do not obligatorially inflect for gender or number.

Verbs
Muskogean verbs have a complex ablaut system; the verbal stem almost always changes depending on aspect; less commonly, it is affected by tense or modality.  In Muskogean linguistics, the different forms are known as "grades."

Verbs mark for first and second person, as well as agent and patient (Choctaw and Chickasaw also mark for dative). Third-persons (he, she, it) have a null-marker.

Plurality of a noun agent is marked by either affixation on the verb or an innately plural verbal stem:

Pluralization via affixation, Choctaw:

ishimpa
ish-impa
2SG.NOM-eat
"you [sg.] eat"

hashimpa
hash-impa
2PL.NOM-eat
"you [pl.] eat"

Innately-numbered verbal stems, Mikasuki:

łiniik
run. SG
"to run (singular)"

palaak
run. PAUCAL
"to run (several)"

mataak
run. PL
"to run (many)"

Vocabulary
Below is a list of basic vocabulary in five Muskogean languages from Broadwell (1992):

Proto-language

Proto-Muskogean reconstructions by Booker (2005):

Notes

External links

Muskogean Language Family page at native-languages.org
Chickasaw Language Information & Videos - Chickasaw.TV

Bibliography
 Booker, Karen. (2005). "Muskogean Historical Phonology." In Hardy, Heather Kay and Scancarelli, Janine (eds.), Native languages of the Southeastern United States, 246-298. Lincoln: University of Nebraska Press.
 Broadwell, George Aaron. (1992). Reconstructing Proto-Muskogean Language and Prehistory: Preliminary Results (PDF). Paper presented at the Southern Anthropological Society, St. Augustine, FL. Retrieved on 2009-05-03.
 Campbell, Lyle. (1997). American Indian languages: The historical linguistics of Native America. New York: Oxford University Press. .
Coker, William S. (1999) "Pensacola, 1686-1821." in Judith Anne Bense. (1999) Editor. Archaeology of colonial Pensacola. University Press of Florida.  Found at Google Books
 Crawford, James M. (Ed.). (1975a). Studies in Southeastern Indian Languages. Athens, GA: University of Georgia Press.
 Crawford, James M. (1975b). "Southeastern Indian Languages". In Crawford (ed.) 1975, pp. 1–120.
 Goddard, Ives (Ed.). (1996). Languages. Handbook of North American Indians (W. C. Sturtevant, General Ed.) (Vol. 17). Washington, D. C.: Smithsonian Institution. .
 Haas, Mary (1951). "The Proto-Gulf word for water (with notes on Siouan–Yuchi)". International Journal of American Linguistics 17: 71–79.
 Haas, Mary. (1952). "The Proto-Gulf word for 'land' (with notes on Proto-Siouan)". International Journal of American Linguistics 18:238–240.
 Haas, Mary. (1973). "The Southeast". In T. A. Sebeok (Ed.), Linguistics in North America (part 2, pp. 1210–1249). The Hague: Mouton.
 Hardy, Heather. (2005). "Introduction". In Hardy & Scancarelli 2005, pp. 69–74.
 Hardy, Heather & Janine Scancarelli. (2005). Native Languages of the Southeastern United States. Lincoln, NE: University of Nebraska Press.
Hopkins, Nicholas A. The Native Languages of the Southeastern United States (PDF). Report for the Foundation for the Advancement of Mesoamerican Studies, Inc. Retrieved on 2009-05-03.
 Martin, Jack B. & Pamela Munro. (2005). "Proto-Muskogean Morphology". in Hardy & Scancarelli eds., pp. 299–320
Milanich, Jerald T. (1995). Florida Indians and the Invasion from Europe. Gainesville, FL: University Press of Florida. 
 Mithun, Marianne. (1999). The languages of Native North America. Cambridge: Cambridge University Press.  (hbk); .
 Sebeok, Thomas A. (Ed.). (1973). Linguistics in North America (parts 1 & 2).  Current trends in linguistics (Vol. 10). The Hague: Mouton. (Reprinted as Sebeok 1976).
 Sturtevant, William C. (Ed.). (1978–present). Handbook of North American Indians (Vol. 1–20). Washington, D. C.: Smithsonian Institution. (Vols. 1–3, 16, 18–20 not yet published).
 Sturtevant, William C. (1994). "The Misconnection of Guale and Yamasee with Muskogean". International Journal of American Linguistics 60:139–148.
Swanton, John Reed. (1952) The Indian Tribes of North America. Found at Google Books

 
Agglutinative languages
Language families
Indigenous languages of the North American Southeast
South Appalachian Mississippian culture
Gulf languages